Lee Jeong-mi (born 7 February 1966 in Busan) is a South Korean politician. She has served as the leader of the Justice Party since 2022. and previously served as leader from 2017 to 2019 following the previous leadership tenures of Sim Sang-jung. She served as a member of the 20th National Assembly from 2016 to 2020.

References

External links
Official website 
Twitter

Members of the National Assembly (South Korea)
21st-century South Korean women politicians
21st-century South Korean politicians
1966 births
Living people
People from Busan
Democratic Labor Party (South Korea) politicians
Justice Party (South Korea) politicians
Hankuk University of Foreign Studies alumni
South Korean Roman Catholics
Female members of the National Assembly (South Korea)